The sixth and final season of Canadian Idol is the sixth and final installation of the Idol series in Canada and premiered on June 3, 2008, on the CTV Television Network. It is again hosted by Ben Mulroney, with the addition of Jully Black as a special correspondent and general mentor  to the contestants. Farley Flex, Jake Gold, Sass Jordan and Zack Werner all returned as judges. This season saw a number of major and minor show format changes in an effort to keep the franchise fresh and innovative. The final episode of the season, in which the Canadian Idol was crowned, aired on September 10, 2008. The winner of the sixth season was Theo Tams. The sixth season became the final season of Canadian Idol following its cancellation in 2009.

Auditions
Auditions were held in the following cities:
Edmonton, Alberta ( January 26–27): 1,000 Auditioned – 13 Received Gold
Calgary, Alberta ( February 2–3): 1,000 Auditioned – 19 Received Gold
Vancouver, British Columbia ( February 9–10): 1,000 Auditioned – 21 Received Gold
Winnipeg, Manitoba ( February 22–23): 700 Auditioned – 24 Received Gold
Hamilton, Ontario ( March 1–2): 1,000 Auditioned – 27 Received Gold
Ottawa, Ontario ( March 8–9): 660 Auditioned – 20 Received Gold
Montreal, Quebec ( March 15–16): 1,000 Auditioned – 27 Received Gold
Halifax, Nova Scotia ( March 29–30): 450 Auditioned – 10 Received Gold
St. John's, Newfoundland (April 8): 200 Auditioned – 6 Received Gold
Toronto, Ontario ( April 12–13): 2,000 Auditioned – 34 Received Gold

Total Auditions: 9,010
Total Gold Tickets: 201

Show Format Changes
This year of Canadian Idol promises to have a number of changes and surprises to the usual show format.

 Jully Black joined the cast of Canadian Idol as the new correspondent and mentor.
 As introduced last season, competitors are allowed to play instruments in their auditions and performances.
 "Last Chance" Online Auditions were introduced to allow competitors who could not make it to an audition city/date, or who did not receive a gold ticket for their in-person audition, to submit a two-minute audition video on the Canadian Idol website (idol.ctv.ca) for consideration.
 This season, apparently due to the increase in extremely talented contestants, the number of semi-finalist was increased by 2, producing a Top 24. Also for the first time, the chosen semi-finalists were not evenly split between male and female performers: 15 men and 9 women made up the Top 24. Due to the uneven number of men and women, the performance groups during the semi-final rounds were also not being split according to gender. Additionally, during the semi-final elimination rounds the composition of the two performance groups varied from week to week; thus, unlike in previous years, a performer did not always compete against the same sub-group of semifinalists, or on the same performance night.
 Because of the increase in the total number of semi-finalist (24, instead of 22), the last week of semifinals saw 6 competitors (instead of the usual 4) eliminated in order to have a Top 10.
Elimination song changed to "When I'm Gone" by Simple Plan.

Broadcast Schedule
The sixth season of Canadian Idol premiered on June 3, 2008. Highlights from the initial auditions held across Canada, and the elimination rounds of "Toronto Week" (Top 200), were aired in 5 one-hour episodes over 3 weeks:
Episode 1 (2008-06-03): Auditions held in Toronto, Calgary, Edmonton
Episode 2 (2008-06-09): Auditions held in Montreal, Vancouver, Winnipeg
Episode 3 (2008-06-10): Auditions held in Hamilton, Ottawa, St. Johns, Halifax
Episode 4 (2008-06-16): Top 200 (day 1 & 2) Initial solo performances and group performances
Episode 5 (2008-06-17): Top 200 (day 3) Final solo performances; selection of Top 24 announced

The semifinals (episodes 6–14) began airing June 23 and consisted of 3 weeks of eliminations, resulting in the selection of the final Top 10 contestants. In each of the 3 semifinal weeks, the contestants were split into two groups, one group performing each evening (aired Mondays and Tuesdays); and the results of the public voting are announced on Wednesday evening. The Top 10 was revealed on July 9 (the results show of the last semifinal elimination week).

The finals (episodes 15–32) began airing on July 14, 2008. Performances aired on Monday evenings and the results of the public voting were announced the following evening. Encore presentations of episodes are also broadcast on the now CTV-owned MuchMoreMusic on Thursday nights. The season finale aired September 10, 2008.

Contestants
For this season, there was an unexpected format change. Because of the quality of some of the male singers, the producers and the judges decided to make a Top 24 containing the best singers, based on talent not gender. The semifinalists performed for three weeks in mixed-groups, meaning that eliminations were made regardless of gender, until the Top 10 was determined on July 9, 2008.

From a Top 24 composed of 15 males and 9 females (as selected by the judges), the Canada-wide voting during the 3 semifinal elimination rounds produced a final Top 10 comprising 8 male and 2 female contestants.

Top 10 Finalists

 Theo Tams, 23, Lethbridge, AB, Student - WINNER, Canadian Idol, Season 6
 Mitch MacDonald, 22, Port Hood, NS, Carpenter, Musician (Runner-up, 2008-09-10)
 Drew Wright, 28, Collingwood, ON, Musician, House Painter (Eliminated 2008-09-02)
 Earl Stevenson, 23, Lloydminster, AB, Swamper for a Backhoe Operator (Eliminated 2008-08-26)
 Mookie Morris, 18, Toronto, ON, Musician (Eliminated 2008-08-19)
 Amberly Thiessen, 19, Seven Persons, AB, Student (Eliminated 2008-08-12) 
 Mark Day, 20, Portugal Cove, NL, Student, Respite Care Worker (Eliminated 2008-08-05)
 Sebastian Pigott, 25, Toronto, ON, Actor, Writer (Eliminated 2008-07-29) 
 Katherine St-Laurent, 17, Otterburn Park, QC, Student (Eliminated 2008-07-22) 
 Adam Castelli, 26, Hamilton, ON, Carpenter, Singer/Songwriter (Eliminated 2008-07-15)

Semifinalists
Eliminated 2008-07-09 from the Top 16:
Marie-Pierre Bellerose, 25, Quebec City, QC, Bartender
Katelyn Dawn, 19, Winnipeg, MB, Singer/Songwriter
Martin Kerr, 25, Edmonton, AB, Independent Singer/Songwriter
Omar Lunan, 29, Scarborough, ON, Registered Massage Therapist
Gary Morissette, 21, Fruitvale, BC, Musician, Construction Worker
Oliver Pigott, 27, Toronto, ON, Singer/Songwriter
Eliminated 2008-07-02 from the Top 20:
Lisa Bell*, 27, Winnipeg, MB, Coffee Shop Manager'
Paul Clifford, 26, Port Moody, BC, Bartender
Jesse Cottam, 23, Calgary, AB, Music Teacher, Musician
Jessica Sheppard, 22, Toronto, ON, Visual Manager
Eliminated 2008-06-25 from the Top 24:
Lindsay Barr, 26, Halifax, NS, Singer, Writer, Art Student
Shaun Francisco, 25, Vancouver, BC, Coffee Shop Barista
Tetiana Ostapowych, 25, Toronto, ON, Session Singer/Songwriter/Server
Lindsay Robins, 21, Montreal, QC, Singer/Songwriter

Regional Representation
The breakdown of the Top 24 and Top 10 according to the contestants' home province (provincial region), is as follows:

Canadian Idol announced the regional representation of the Top 10 using different regional divisions than was used for the Top 24, as follows:
West: 3
East: 5
Atlantic: 2

The Semifinals (Top 24)
The semifinals consisted of three weeks of elimination rounds to reduce the Top 24 contestants (as chosen by the judges) to the final Top 10 (as decided by public vote). This was the first round in which eliminations are the result of public voting. Performances take place in a more intimate venue with a smaller stage and audience than the finals. Multiple contestants are eliminated each week.

This season, the semifinals saw a number of format changes: from the number of contestants (24, instead of 22), and an uneven gender composition (more males than females), to the performance group division (not by gender), and variation of group composition (changed from week to week). The semifinals results shows also saw some 'surprise' (unannounced) changes, including special 'showcase' performances and judge-selected 'encore' performances, and a variation in the number of contestants eliminated (6, instead of 4, in the final week).

Top 24 week
Performances:

Results (2008-06-25):

The first 4 contestants eliminated from the Top 24 were (in order announced):

 Group 1:
 Tetiana Ostapowych
 Lindsay Barr
 Group 2:
 Lindsay Robins
 Shaun Francisco

(There was no bottom 3 announced for each group.)

The first results show departed from the traditional format to present a "showcase performance" from the Top 24, prior to announcing the voting results. The Top 24 performed the following songs, in groups of two to four, as follows:

 "Have You Ever Seen the Rain?" (Creedence Clearwater Revival) – Lindsay Robins, Paul Clifford, Shaun Francisco, Martin Kerr
 "In the Midnight Hour" (Wilson Pickett) – Adam Castelli, Lindsay Barr
 "Old Time Rock and Roll" (Bob Seger) – Mookie Morris, Earl Stevenson, Mark Day, Jessica Sheppard
 "Yellow" – Mitch MacDonald, Amberly Thiessen, Jesse Cottam, Katelyn Dawn
 "I Heard It Through the Grapevine" – Drew Wright, Omar Lunan, Gary Morisette
 "Fly Like an Eagle" – Tetiana Ostapowych, Oliver Pigott, Sebastian Pigott
 "Imagine" – Theo Tams, Lisa Bell, Marie-Pierre Bellerose, Katherine St-Laurent

Top 20 week
Performances:

Results (2008-07-02):

The bottom 3 contestants from each performance night were:

 Group 1:
 Marie-Pierre Bellerose
 Paul Clifford – Eliminated
 Lisa Bell – Eliminated
 Group 2:
 Adam Castelli
 Jesse Cottam – Eliminated
 Jessica Sheppard – Eliminated

The results show once again departed from traditional format, this time by having an encore of the judges' favorite performances from the previous two nights, prior to announcing the voting results. In order of performance, the encores were:

 Theo Tams – "Collide" chosen by Farley Flex
 Amberly Thiessen – "Everything I Own" chosen by Zack Werner
 Oliver Pigott – "Sorry Seems to Be the Hardest Word" chosen by Jake Gold
 Omar Lunan – "Ain't No Sunshine" chosen by Sass Jordan

Top 16 week
Performances:

Results (2008-07-09):

In order to have a final Top 10, the bottom 3 contestants from each performance night were eliminated (resulting in a total of 6 contestants eliminated – instead of 4, as in each of the previous two weeks of semifinal eliminations).

Contestants were called to the stage, four at a time (two from each performance night), and the results of the voting announced, sending successful contestants to fill the 10 stools set up on the stage for the final Top 10.

The 6 eliminated contestants were (in order revealed):

 Martin Kerr
 Gary Morisette
 Omar Lunan
 Katelyn Dawn
 Marie-Pierre Bellerose
 Oliver Pigott

The Finals (Top 10)
The Top 10 was officially announced on July 9, 2008 (the last semifinals result show). These are the finalists (in order revealed):

 Mark Day
 Drew Wright
 Mookie Morris
 Earl Stevenson
 Theo Tams
 Katherine St-Laurent
 Amberly Thiessen
 Mitch MacDonald
 Adam Castelli
 Sebastian Pigott

With 8 male and 2 female contestants, the season's Top 10 was the most gender-uneven to date. Top 10 performances began July 14, 2008.

Mentors
The following were mentors for this season of Canadian Idol:
 Simple Plan
 Gavin Rossdale
 Bryan Adams
 Tom Jones
 Anne Murray
 John Legend
 Hedley

Finalists' Performances
Each week a song theme is presented to the competitors. Each competitor must base their song choice on the theme of the week.

Performance week theme:
 Top 24: Semifinals (contestant's choice)
 Top 20: Semifinals (contestant's choice)
 Top 16: Semifinals (contestant's choice)
 Top 10: The songs of David Bowie
 Top 9: "Rock and Roll Heaven" (classic songs by artists no longer living)
 Top 8: "Unplugged" with mentor Gavin Rossdale, former Bush front-man
 Top 7: Top 10 UK Hits with mentor Tom Jones
 Top 6: Canadian Rock with mentors Simple Plan
 Top 5: The music of The Beatles (judges choice)
 Top 4: The songs of Anne Murray, with mentor Anne Murray (each contestant sang one song from Anne Murray's songbook and one song by any artist they choose)
 Top 3: The songs of Bryan Adams, with mentor Bryan Adams
 Top 2: Season Finale, with mentors John Legend and Hedley (each contestant performed 3 songs: one of their choice, one selected by the judges, and the song designated for release as the "winner's single" should he win the competition)

Contestants (listed, after the winner, in reverse order of elimination):

 Theo Tams, 23 (born July 12, 1985), Lethbridge, AB
 Top 24: "Apologize" – OneRepublic
 Top 20: "Collide" – Howie Day
 Top 16: "Bubbly" – Colbie Caillat
 Top 10: "Silly Boy Blue" – David Bowie
 Top 9: "No Woman, No Cry" – Bob Marley & The Wailers
 Top 8: "Weak in the Knees" – Serena Ryder
 Top 7: "You Had Me" – Joss Stone - Bottom 3 (2008-08-05)
 Top 6: "Sweet Ones" – Sarah Slean
 Top 5: "The Long and Winding Road" – The Beatles
 Top 4: "You Don't Know Me" – Cindy Walker and Eddy Arnold (covered by Anne Murray)
 Top 4: "Chariot" – Gavin DeGraw
 Top 3:"Heaven" – Bryan Adams
 Top 3:"When You're Gone" – Bryan Adams
 Top 2: "Good Mother" – Jann Arden
 Top 2: "Sing" – Winner's single
 Top 2: "I Wanna Know What Love Is" – Foreigner - WINNER (2008-09-10)

 Mitch MacDonald, 22 (born October 22, 1985), Port Hood, NS (Only contestant never to place in the bottom 2 or 3)
 Top 24: "Follow Through" – Gavin DeGraw
 Top 20: "I'm Yours" – Jason Mraz
 Top 16: "Blue" – The Jayhawks
 Top 10: "Moonage Daydream" – David Bowie
 Top 9: "Angel Eyes" – The Jeff Healey Band
 Top 8: "Oh, Atlanta" – Alison Krauss
 Top 7: "Jealous Guy" – John Lennon
 Top 6: "I Love This Town" – Joel Plaskett
 Top 5: "In My Life" – The Beatles
 Top 4: "Cotton Jenny" – Gordon Lightfoot (covered by Anne Murray)
 Top 4: "Between the Bars" – Elliott Smith
 Top 3: "Heat of The Night" – Bryan Adams
 Top 3: "When You Love Someone" – Bryan Adams
 Top 2: "Paris" – Gordie Sampson
 Top 2: "Where We Begin" – Winner's single
 Top 2: "If" – Bread - Runner-up (2008-09-10)

 Drew Wright, 28 (born October 5, 1979), Collingwood, ON
 Top 24: "Under Pressure" – Queen
 Top 20: "The Grace" – Neverending White Lights
 Top 16: "The Reason" – Hoobastank
 Top 10: "Five Years" – David Bowie
 Top 9: "No Rain" – Blind Melon
 Top 8: "Sunday Morning" – Maroon 5
 Top 7: "Creep" – Radiohead
 Top 6: "That Song" – Big Wreck - Bottom 3 (2008-08-12)
 Top 5: "While My Guitar Gently Weeps" – The Beatles - Bottom 2 (2008-08-19)
 Top 4: "Hey Daddy" – Anne Murray
 Top 4: "Gravity" – John Mayer
 Top 3: "Cuts Like a Knife" – Bryan Adams
 Top 3: "I'm Ready" – Bryan Adams - Eliminated (2008-09-02)

 Earl Stevenson, 23 (born February 18, 1985), Lloydminster, AB
 Top 24: "All Along the Watchtower" – Bob Dylan
 Top 20: "Something to Talk About" – Bonnie Raitt
 Top 16: "Like a Rolling Stone" – Bob Dylan
 Top 10: "Rock 'n' Roll Suicide" – David Bowie
 Top 9: "Light My Fire" – The Doors (Jose Feliciano version)
 Top 8: "Two" – Ryan Adams
 Top 7: "Change the World" – Eric Clapton - Bottom 3 (2008-08-05)
 Top 6: "Little Bones" – The Tragically Hip - Bottom 3 (2008-08-12)
 Top 5: "With a Little Help From My Friends" – The Beatles
 Top 4: "Killing Me Softly with His Song" – Roberta Flack (covered by Anne Murray)
 Top 4: "The Joker" – Steve Miller Band - Eliminated (2008-08-26)

 Mookie Morris, 18 (born September 19, 1989), Toronto, ON
 Top 24: "Twist and Shout" – The Isley Brothers
 Top 20: "Naïve" – The Kooks
 Top 16: "Valerie" – The Zutons
 Top 10: "The Man Who Sold The World" – David Bowie - Bottom 3 (2008-07-15)
 Top 9: "I Feel Good" – James Brown
 Top 8: "Ophelia" – The Band - Bottom 3 (2008-07-29)
 Top 7: "Lola" – The Kinks
 Top 6: "Magic Carpet Ride" – Steppenwolf
 Top 5: "Come Together" – The Beatles - Eliminated (2008-08-19)

 Amberly Thiessen, 19 (born October 17, 1988), Seven Persons, AB. (Last female contestant as of the Top 8.)
 Top 24: "What Am I to You?" – Norah Jones
 Top 20: "Everything I Own" – David Gates
 Top 16: "You and I Both" – Jason Mraz
 Top 10: "Space Oddity" – David Bowie (Natalie Merchant version)
 Top 9: "Redemption Song" – Bob Marley - Bottom 3 (2008-07-22)
 Top 8: "The Way I Am" – Ingrid Michaelson
 Top 7: "Put Your Records On" – Corinne Bailey Rae
 Top 6: "1234" – Feist - Eliminated (2008-08-12)

 Mark Day, 20 (born May 29, 1988), Portugal Cove, NL
 Top 24: "Alone" – Heart
 Top 20: "In Love with a Girl" – Gavin DeGraw
 Top 16: "Against All Odds (Take a Look at Me Now)" – Phil Collins
 Top 10: "Dancing in the Street" – Martha and the Vandellas (David Bowie and Mick Jagger version)
 Top 9: "Dance With My Father" – Luther Vandross
 Top 8: "Stay" – Sugarland - Bottom 3 (2008-07-29)
 Top 7: "Bleeding Love" – Leona Lewis - Eliminated (2008-08-05)

 Sebastian Pigott, 25 (born 14 February 83), Toronto, ON
 Top 24: "Dark Horse" – Amanda Marshall 
 Top 20: "Daydream" – The Lovin' Spoonful
 Top 16: "Bring It On Home to Me" – Sam Cooke
 Top 10: "Let's Spend The Night Together" – David Bowie - Bottom 3 (2008-07-15)
 Top 9: "Love Me" – Elvis Presley - Bottom 2 (2008-07-22)
 Top 8: "Lucille" – Little Richard - Eliminated (2008-07-29)

 Katherine St-Laurent, 17 (born May 18, 1991), Otterburn Park, QC
 Top 24: "Total Eclipse of the Heart" – Bonnie Tyler
 Top 20: "The First Cut Is the Deepest" – Cat Stevens
 Top 16: "Love Is a Battlefield" – Pat Benatar
 Top 10: "Cat People (Putting Out Fire) – David Bowie
 Top 9: "Move Over" – Janis Joplin - Eliminated (2008-07-22)

 Adam Castelli, 26, Hamilton, ON
 Top 24: "Mess Around" – Ray Charles
 Top 20: "Gone till November" – Wyclef Jean - Bottom 3 (2008-07-02)
 Top 16: "If I Were A Carpenter" – Tim Hardin
 Top 10: "Rebel, Rebel" – David Bowie - Eliminated (2008-07-15)

Results Show Performances
The guests and songs performed during the results show broadcasts are listed here.

 Top 10 results show (2008-07-15):
 No guest performer
 Group performances: "Golden Years" (Sebastian, Theo, Adam); "Changes" (Mark, Amberly, Katherine, Mitch); "Fame" (Mookie, Earl, Drew); "Modern Love" (entire group)
 Top 9 results show (2008-07-22):
 Jaydee Bixby, Canadian Idol season 5 runner-up, "Old Fashioned Girl"
Group performances: "Dream a Little Dream of Me" (Amberly, Katherine, Mark); "Purple Haze" (Drew, Earl, Mitch); "A Little Less Conversation" (Sebastian, Theo, Mookie – later joined by entire group)
 Top 8 results show (2008-07-29):
 Gavin Rossdale, "Love Remains the Same"
 Group performance: "My Generation"
 Top 7 results show (2008-08-05):
 Tom Jones, "It's Not Unusual", "If He Should Ever Leave You"
 Group performance: Medley of Tom Jones songs, "Green Green Grass of Home" (Mark, Amberly And Theo) and "Delilah" (Drew, Earl, Mookie, Mitch)
 Top 6 results show (2008-08-12):
 Simple Plan, "Your Love Is a Lie"
 Group performance: "Money City Maniacs"
 Top 5 results show (2008-08-19):
 No guest performer
 Group performances: Blackbird (Mitch), Eleanor Rigby (Drew), Get Back (Mookie), Revolution (Earl), Let It Be (Theo)
 Top 4 results show (2008-08-26):
 Anne Murray, "Daydream Believer", "Could I Have This Dance"; Jordin Sparks, "One Step at a Time"
 Group performance: "Danny's Song"
 Top 3 results show (2008-09-02):
 Bryan Adams
 Group performance: No group performance this night
 Finale (2008-09-10):
 Hedley "Old School", Brian Melo "Back To Me", Jully Black "Queen", John Legend "Green Light", Mariah Carey "We Belong Together" and "I'm That Chick"
 Group performances: multiple performances by the Top 10, including "Can't Stop This Thing We Started (Bryan Adams), "What Kind of World Do You Want" (Five For Fighting), and "Home" (Daughtry) plus individual performances and Mitch and Theo sang "Hasn't Hit Me Yet" by Blue Rodeo,; crowned Canadian Idol Theo Tams performed his winner's single, "Sing"
 Individual performances from the Top 10 include:
"Who Do You Love" (Adam Castelli), "Down On The Corner" (Sebastian Pigott), "When Will I Be Loved" (Amberly Thiessen), "You'll Be In My Heart" (Mark Day), "Feelin' Alright" (Earl Stevenson), "Crazy On You" (Katherine St-Laurent), "Papa's Got A Brand New Bag" (Mookie Morris), "Nowhere With You" (Mitch MacDonald), "I'm Still Standing" (Theo Tams), and "Are You Gonna Go My Way" (Drew Wright)

Eliminations (Summary)

Notes:
 With the exception of the Top 9, Canadian Idol did not reveal which of the bottom three contestants received the third and second lowest number of votes; only the eliminated contestants were announced.
 Of the two female contestants that made it into the Top 10, as of the Top 8, there was only one female contestant remaining in the competition. As of the Top 5, there were no female contestants remaining in the competition; no other Idol competition (with the exception of Idol Serbia, Montenegro & Macedonia) became single-gender at such early stage of the competition.
 Katherine St-Laurent was the only contestant in the Top 10 to not have been in the bottom three before her elimination. Mitch MacDonald was the only contestant to have never been in the bottom three.

Releases
Theo Tams – Give It All Away (May 19, 2009)
Earl Stevenson – Ghost (February 14, 2010)
Jesse Cottam (as Amber Pacific) – Virtues (April 13, 2010)
Mookie Morris- Mookie and the Loyalists (EP released to iTunes October 12, 2010 and all other digital retailers October 19, 2010)

Ratings

References

External links
 Official website
 Top 24 Profiles

2008 Canadian television seasons
6
2008 Canadian television series endings
2008 in Canadian music